The flag of the Italian region of Veneto derives from the flag historically used by the Republic of Venice (697–1797), a maritime republic centered on the modern city of Venice. The modern flag was adopted by legge regionale (regional law) 20 maggio 1975, n. 56 and amended by L.R. del 22 febbraio 1999, which deleted the words "Regione del Veneto".
Regione del Veneto also has a banner (gonfalone), its design identical to the flag's except in its vertical orientation.

Design

The main overall layout and design of the Venetian banner was kept. The coat of arms of the Region is set in a square in the center of the flag: the Lion of Saint Mark with the opened gospel (reading the Latin motto Pax tibi Marce evangelista meus, "Peace to you Mark, my evangelist") rests its paws on the landscape of Veneto: sea (the Adriatic), land (the Venetian Plain) and mountains (the Alps).

Attached to the fly edge are seven tails. Each one bears in the middle the coat of arms of one of Veneto's seven province capitals, sorted in reverse alphabetical order:
{| cellpadding=0
|-
|style="text-align:center;"|   || || Province of Vicenza
|-
|style="text-align:center;"|  || || Province of Verona
|-
|style="text-align:center;"|  || || Province of Venice
|-
| style="text-align:center;"|  || || Province of Treviso
|-
|style="text-align:center;"|   || || Province of Rovigo
|-
|style="text-align:center;"|  || || Province of Padua
|-
|style="text-align:center;"|   || || Province of Belluno
|}

A tricolour ribbon is to be knotted just below the flagpole finial.

Differences from the Republic of Venice flag

 The Lion is no longer on a red field.
 The tails were six, representing the six sestieri ("sixths", the districts of old Venice), whilst the new flag has seven tails, containing the flags of the provinces of Veneto.
 Dark blue has been added to the red and gold decorations, as this colour was acknowledged as a symbol of the Veneti in the past (blavum seu venetum colorem "blue, that is, Veneto colour").

References

External links

Veneto
Republic of Venice
Culture in Veneto
Veneto
Veneto
Flags introduced in 1975